Frielinghaus is a German surname. Notable people with the surname include:

Gustav Frielinghaus (1912–1963), German Luftwaffe ace
Paul Frielinghaus (born 1959), German actor

German-language surnames
Surnames of German origin